Michael J. Celizic (August 18, 1948 – September 22, 2010) was an American author and columnist.

Celizic was born in Leroy Township, Ohio, and was a graduate of Painesville Riverside High School and the University of Notre Dame.

Celizic authored seven books, including The Biggest Game of Them All: Notre Dame, Michigan State and the Fall of 1966.

Celizic had been a reporter for the Home News Tribune of New Brunswick, New Jersey, and a sports columnist for The Record of Hackensack, New Jersey.  He was also a columnist for msnbc.com for 13 years. He was known for a trademark look that always included a hat.

Celizic died of cancer, survived by a wife, Margaret, and four children. He had covered the treatment on his lymphoma in a journal for MSNBC up until his decision to forgo further chemotherapy treatments following an unfavorable diagnosis of the cancer's return from remission.

Notes

References 
 Malone, George (September 23, 2010).  "Obituary" NBC Sports
 Levin, Jay (September 22, 2010). "Obituary NorthJersey.com
 "So Long, Mike Celizic", Jared Max, CBS New York, September 23, 2010
 "Here’s To The Hat – My Last Conversation With Mike Celizic", Ann Liguori, CBS New York, September 23, 2010

1948 births
2010 deaths
American columnists
American male non-fiction writers
University of Notre Dame alumni
Deaths from lymphoma